Amorolfine (or amorolfin), is a morpholine antifungal drug that inhibits Δ14-sterol reductase and cholestenol Δ-isomerase, which depletes ergosterol and causes ignosterol to accumulate in the fungal cytoplasmic cell membranes. Marketed as Curanail, Loceryl, Locetar, and Odenil, amorolfine is commonly available in the form of a nail lacquer, containing 5% amorolfine hydrochloride as the active ingredient. It is used to treat onychomycosis (fungal infection of the toe- and fingernails). Amorolfine 5% nail lacquer in once-weekly or twice-weekly applications was shown in two decades-old studies to be between 60% and 71% effective in treating toenail onychomycosis; complete cure rates three months after stopping treatment (after six months of treatment) were 38% and 46%. However, full experimental details of these trials were not available, and since they were first reported in 1992 there have been no subsequent trials.

It is a topical solution for the treatment of toenail infections. Systemic treatments may be considered more effective.

It is approved for sale over-the-counter in Australia, Brazil, Russia, Germany, and the UK, and is approved for the treatment of toenail fungus by prescription in other countries. It is not approved for the treatment of onychomycosis in the United States or Canada. However, it can be ordered from there by mail from other countries.

See also
 Ciclopirox

Notes

Antifungals
Morpholines